Bogdan II (1409 – 17 October 1451) was a prince of Moldavia from October 12, 1449 to October 17, 1451.

Family 
According to some historians, he was the bastard of Alexander the Good, by an unknown mother. On the contrary, according to the others, he was the brother of Alexander the Good. Bogdan II was the father of the Stephen the Great. He had a very good relationship with Iancu de Hunedoara, who supported his accession to the throne. He was married to Doamna Oltea (Lady Oltea), who became a nun under the name of Maria, She died on November 4, 1465 and was  buried at the Probota Monastery of Suceava County.

References

See also

Rulers of Moldavia
1409 births
1451 deaths
15th-century Romanian people
House of Bogdan-Mușat